The Dirigibile Italia Arctic station (in Italian: Base artica Dirigibile Italia) is an Italian research station in Ny-Ålesund, Svalbard, Norway.

Managed by the National Research Council of Italy (CNR), it was inaugurated in May 1997, in memory of the airship Italia expedition of Umberto Nobile (1928).

It is a  permanent research station with laboratories and offices which can host up to seven people, but it is inhabited only in case of ongoing scientific activities. Studies coordinated by CNR focus on the intricate climatic interactions among the atmosphere, the hydrosphere, the biosphere, the lithosphere, and the cryosphere.

The research station also runs the Amundsen-Nobile Climate Change Tower, measuring atmospheric parameters, installed by the Kings Bay and inaugurated on 30 April 2009.

See also
 List of research stations in the Arctic

References

External links

Science and technology in Italy
Research stations in Svalbard
Ny-Ålesund
1997 establishments in Norway